Apung Mamacalulu (Merciful Lord, Our Lord of Great Mercy) or the Santo Entierro (Holy Burial) of Angeles City, is a statue depicting the burial of Jesus Christ and is enshrined at the Archdiocesan Shrine of Christ our Lord of the Holy Sepulchre in Lourdes Sur, Angeles City in the Philippines. Thousands flock to hear the special Holy Mass celebrated every Friday at the shrine.

Apu, as the lying statue of Jesus is fondly called by devotees, has become a symbol of hope for people longing for a connection to the divine especially when all else failed. His image is supine, bruised, caught in the final act of love and sacrifice that has spelled salvation for those who believe in him.  Every kiss that lands his badly bruised feet or a touch that grazes his battered hand comes with a deep conviction that through his death and resurrection, He made all things new.  Apung Mamacalulu bestows mercy beyond the grave.

Origin 
The tradition of venerating the image of the dead Christ traces its origin to the early Church.  The earliest articles of veneration are the Sudarium of Oviedo and the Shroud of Turin, the very shroud believed to have been used in burying the body of the dead Christ. Several representations of the dead Christ became common in the fifteenth century. When Spain introduced Christianity to the Philippines, they brought several representative images of the dead Christ. Known by such names as Santo Sepulcro (Holy Sepulcher), Santo Cristo Yacente (Lying Holy Christ), Santo Retiro (Holy Retirement), Santo Entierro (Holy Burial, Lord of the Holy Sepulcher), the most common portrayal is that of the dead Christ lying in state on a stately bier, a very popular icon in the Philippines.

Fr. Bulatao, SJ, a noted author on Philippine religious psychology, writes that the Filipinos identify with the suffering of the dead Christ because of poverty and other socio-economic difficulties they experience. Angeles City has widely revered two images of Apung Mamacalulu – one at the Pisamban Maragul and the other at the shrine in Brgy. Lourdes Sur.

History 
Padre Macario Paras had ordered the creation of the image and then gifted it to the Catholic church.

that day. It was first installed in a little sanctuary built by Padre Paras on his own premises, which may have also been located somewhere within Barrio Lourdes Sur (then known as Talimundoc, within the vast Paras and Dayrit estates) where it became an object of veneration among the pious inhabitants of the place. An entry in the book of records of the Roman Catholic Church of Angeles [marked as exhibit B in G.R. No. 30242] shows that the image, its carriage, and other appendages, appear to have been given as a gift to the church by Padre Paras. There is also a similar entry found in the church records under the date February 20, 1865, where it appears that the Apu image, with its adornments and carriage, was a gift from Padre Paras and was then in his care. Another document shows that the image, together with its carriage, was transferred to the church in 1872.

About 1896 or 1897 during the Philippine Revolution, the image and the carriage were moved and transported to another municipality for safekeeping.  Henson writes that during the tumultuous years of the revolution, the image was kept in barrio Sapangbato. It was brought back to the church sometime in 1904, where it remained to this day.  The image is taken out on two occasions during procession on Good Friday and during the fiesta held in October.

The execution of Roman Payumu 

Around the middle of October 1897, a band of Capampangan revolutionaries staged a raid on Bo. Talimunduc (now Brgy. Lourdes Sur). They were from the barrio of Tibo, Mabalacat, all on horseback and led by a captain.  They entered the Angeles boundary through an area at the foothills of the Zambales Mountains known as Pati by the Aetas, in the Sitio of Mangga, Bo. Sapangbato. On their way to Angeles town proper, they passed the barrios of Amsic and Pampang and succeeded in recruiting young men. In the town itself, they crossed through Henson Street and fell upon Bo. Talimunduc where a group of young men voluntarily joined the Katipunero, firmly believing in the cause of Katipunan Revolution that was then converging into Pampanga from the provinces of Bulacan, Bataan, Nueva Ecija and Tarlac.

Upon learning of this Katipunan raid, the Spanish cazadores ("hunters", as the Spanish Army Infantrymen were known then) and local Macabebe guardia civil (civil guards) stationed at the casa tribunal (town hall) sprang into action and rushed to Bo. Talimunduc. There they found a number of young men dressed-up in travelling clothes, but the Spaniards were told that the Katipunan band had already fled towards Bo. So, a platoon of cazadores and guardia civil rushed to Bo. Cayapa in hot pursuit. Meanwhile, the seven dressed-up young men were arrested and their arms tied with rope in Miquit-a-sicu fashion (tied elbows meeting at one's back), the Spanish military method of tying-up prisoners, that was guaranteed to produce intense and continuous pain at the shoulders, elbows and chest. They were then taken to the town of Baculud (now Bacolor), then the capital of Pampanga, where the provincial jail was located. They were never heard from again to this day, however, two were identified – Cornelio Manalang and Crispulo Punsalan.

The platoon who rushed to Bo. Capaya in search of the rebel band found the barrio deserted, the inhabitants having fled for fear of Spanish reprisal. However, in an outlying field, they found a lone farmer tending his baritan, a small field of a special grass called barit that was sold and fed to calesa (carriage) horses. The farmer was Roman Payumu, a humble zacatero, a gatherer and provider of animal feed like grass for horses. Although illiterate and ignorant family man, he was very industrious and a good provider. He was a deeply religious man with an intense faith in God and a very devout Catholic. After selling all his barit grass to carriage drivers in the town marketplace every evening, he made it a point to pray fervently at the Holy Rosary Parish Church in Angeles town proper. When the Quinario devotion, prior to the fiesta of Apung Mamacalulu, was instituted on October 23, 1897, he quickly volunteered as a regular cargador (bearer) of the Apu during processions where he was popularly known by his nickname, Duman.

Finding the barrio Capaya completely deserted, the platoon ganged-up on Duman who was brusquely interrogated regarding the Katupunero band that raided Bo. Capaya and the whereabouts of the entire barrio population. The poor Duman, knowing nothing of what transpired in his village as his field was quite far from the village, answered he knew nothing what the soldiers were talking about. Immediately, he was branded as a big liar and was quickly accused of being a Katipunero himself! The guards took turns in hitting him with their rifle butts on the head, chest and back to force him to talk, but Duman only wept in pain and insisted that he knew nothing. The soldiers continued to beat him up until nothing but blood came out of his mouth, nose and ears. Exasperated, the soldiers tied his elbows in miquit-a-sicu fashion, and with a long rope tied around his neck, the bloodied Duman was taken on foot to the town hall for further interrogation. Once inside the municipal jail, the guards mercilessly beat him up with solid bamboo clubs to extract revolutionary information to no avail. No food or water was given him.

At about noontime on October 25, 1897, the second day of the Quinario devotion, the Capampangan assistant priest, Fr. Vicente Lapus, was sent to Roman Payumu by the Spanish parish priest of Angeles, Most Rev. Rufino Santos, O.S.A., to hear his last confession for he was sentenced to death by firing squad that afternoon. Padre Lapus tried his best to console the condemned prisoner and succeeded in enabling him to make a last confession, and to accept his fate with complete resignation to the divine will of God. Roman was fetched by the soldiers at 2 p.m. with elbows tightly tied and was led outside. The small firing squad was composed of the Spanish cazadores lieutenant, a Spanish corporal named Cabo Moreno, and two civil guards.

As a last request, Duman asked the lieutenant if he could pray to Apung Mamacalulu in the church for the last time. His request was granted and the death squad walked to the church, but all its doors were locked for the siesta (the Spanish tradition of nap time from 1 to 4 p.m.). The execution ground was behind the church, and beyond were vast sugarcane fields that stretched far up to the town of Porac. Desperate to be saved from execution, innocent as he was, ROMAN PAYUMU decided to pray near the reclining statue of Apung Mamacalulu and the closest he could get was at the last closed door of the church (facing the present Parish Hall). The Spanish lieutenant allowed Duman to kneel down outside this closed door where he tearfully implored the Apu to save him from the firing squad. In an intense and desperate outburst he cried out:

The Spanish and local Macabebe soldiers broke into loud laughter seeing the kneeling Duman in a feverish frenzy of emotion.  But unknown to them, Fr. Vicente Lapus was standing right behind the closed church door listening and watching everything through the small cracks. (This was how Payumu's prayer was recorded by Padre Lapus for posterity). The impatient Spanish lieutenant barked: “Puñeta! Todo esto lo que haces es ya de masiado! Levantate!” (Goddammit! This is all simply getting too much! Stand up!). Knowing no Spanish, Duman remained kneeling down and was weeping in utter hopelessness feeling abandoned to certain death by the Apu.  Without warning, a local soldier grabbed his arm and forcefully pulled him up, yelling: “Puta naida mo! Ticdo na ca canu! Panaca ning alte! (Son of a bitch! Stand up now! You thunderstrucked!). Losing his balance, Duman fell to the ground. The guards pulled him up and brusquely pushed him forward to the execution spot, which was the corner church wall before reaching the present sacristy door.

As the condemned man limped forward, he felt that the rope tying his elbows had become loose from the manhandling and had started to drop down! Realizing that his arms had suddenly become free, he quickly decided to run away and darted towards the sugarcane fields right behind the church (now the Holy Angel University campus). The startled executioners seemed paralyzed for a few seconds as Duman dashed away at full speed! The Spaniards were the first to react. They frantically loaded their rifles, aimed at their escaping prisoner who was just barely ten feet away and fired shot after shot! The bewildered Macabebe civil guards followed suit and started firing deadlier Caliber .43 bullets at their fellow Capampangan. Considering the tested accuracy of these then world-class rifles of hitting bulls-eye targets at a distance of 200 yards (roughly 600 feet!), it was incredible how these well-trained professional officers and soldiers could have missed their target, starting from a distance of only ten feet, and after initially firing a total of about twenty shots at their escaping prisoner!

Some 100 feet inside the dense sugarcane field, Duman fell into a luctun trap, which was full of dried leaves and trash. (These were pits – 1 square meter wide and 2 meters deep where young locusts, still without wings called luctun were driven into by groups of peasants during locust infestations, and later cooked into sinigang (sour soup) or candied with muscovado sugar.)  Duman hid himself at the bottom of the pit and covered his body with the trash. His right heel was bleeding from a minor bullet wound.

A few minutes later, the Spaniards organized a large search party and minutely combed all the sugarcane fields behind the church and even thrust their long bayonets in all of the luctun traps they found. The searchers combed the fields up to the barrio of Siniura, Porac but failed to find ROMAN PAYUMU who, all the while, was hiding only about a hundred feet behind the church!

By midnight that same evening, he secretly emerged from the pit, covered with red ants, and proceeded to hide in an outlying village where he remained up to June 1898 when the Spanish Army Forces in Pampanga were defeated by the Capampangan Revolutionary Armies of Gen. Maximino Hizon, thus liberating the entire province from Spanish rule since 1572.

From all indications, the circumstances leading to the escape and salvation of Roman Payumu from certain death cannot be scientifically explained by human reason alone. Although the events were of this world and involved humans, certain inexplicable aspects appear to have mysteriously lingered within some of the events themselves that were undeniably out of this world, hence impossible to explain in physical terms. It was in these “out-worldly realms” of said events that those who knew of the mysterious salvation of Roman Payumu from certain death presented no alternative but to accept wholeheartedly Payumu's own personal but downright simple explanation to the said phenomenon: The Divine Intervention of Apung Mamacalulu!

Duman returned to his old zacatero livelihood and remained an ever loyal bearer of Apung Mamacalulu till his old age and his natural death. The story of Roman Payumu's salvation from a firing squad and subsequent search became the basis of Angeles City's “Fiesta nang Apu” celebrations every last Friday of October, starting from the first Apu Fiesta on October 28, 1897. At the same time, his story spread not only in Pampanga but throughout Central Luzon and started the popular devotion to Apung Mamacalulu for millions of devotees up to the present time, many of whom truthfully attest to innumerable personal petitions and favors granted by the Apu.

The 1928 controversy 

When the image was carried out in procession on Good Friday of 1928, its camarero (caretaker) Eriberto Navarro, acting for his aunt Alvara Fajardo [an heiress to the Paras estate], and with the assistance of numerous other persons [among them several policemen and then town Mayor Juan D. Nepomuceno], caused the image to be taken forcibly from the precincts of the church when the procession was over, and from there it was carried to a place that had been constructed for its deposit. Renato “Katoks” Tayag, author of The Sinners of Angeles, adds a colorful note to the 1928 incident, as recounted to him by a certain Atty. Ricardo Canlas of San Fernando: it is said that the snatching fiasco resulted not only from an ownership dispute but also from a long-standing political quarrel between the then Nacionalistas and Democratas. This incident gave rise to the 1929 replevin suit [a civil action to recover personality] G.R. No. 30242 filed on March 25, 1929, with the Supreme Court, entitled The Roman Catholic Archbishop of Manila vs. Alvara Fajardo and Eriberto Navarro.

The ponente Associate Justice Street wrote:

Prayer to Apung Mamacalulu 
A prayer written by the parish priest and auxiliary bishop of the city of San Fernando, Most Rev. Pablo Virgilio S. David, D.D. S.Th.D.

Kapampangan version

English version

Image gallery

References

External links

The Strange Case of the two Images of Apung Mamacalulu
Lingap ng Apung Mamacalulu
"Apung Mamacalulu: The Santo Entierro of Angeles City" Book Launched

Roman Catholic shrines in the Philippines
Angeles City
Religion in Pampanga